Tullia Linders (1925–2008) was a Swedish archaeologist.

Life
Tullia Linders studied Latin and Ancient Greek already at the equivalent of high school and later at university continued her studies in the classical languages and classical studies. She got a licentiate degree in 1954 and thereafter spent several years as a school teacher in Latin and Ancient Greek. At the same time she kept ties to the university, conducted research and spent time travelling and studying in the Mediterranean area. During this time she also published articles on archaeological and art historical issues, notably on ceramics and tombstones. In 1972 she got a doctoral degree and established herself firmly in the academic world in Sweden. Subsequently, she published a number of works on Greek temple treasures, as well as works about the Classical world directed towards a broader audience. In 1979 she was made professor of classical studies at Uppsala University. In 1989 she became a member of the Royal Swedish Academy of Letters, History and Antiquities.

Works in English
Linders, Tullia & Hellström, Pontus (red.), Architecture and society in Hecatomnid Caria: proceedings of the Uppsala symposium 1987, Univ., Uppsala, 1989
Alroth, Brita & Linders, Tullia (red.), Economics of cult in the ancient Greek world: proceedings of the Uppsala Symposium 1990, Univ., Uppsala, 1992
Linders, Tullia & Nordquist, Gullög C. (red.), Gifts to the gods: proceedings of the Uppsala symposium 1985, Univ., Uppsala, 1987
Linders, Tullia, 'Recension av: Harris, Diane: The treasures of the Parthenon and Erechtheion.', Opuscula Atheniensia., 1997/98 (22/23), s. 162-166, 1999
Linders, Tullia, 'Ritual display and the loss of power.', Religion and power in the ancient Greek world / edited by Pontus Hellström and Brita Alroth., S. [121]-124, 1996
Linders, Tullia, Studies in the treasure records of Artemis Brauronia found in Athens, Svenska inst. i Athen, Diss. Stockholm : Univ.,Aten, 1972
Linders, Tullia, The treasurers of the other gods in Athens and their functions, Hain, Meisenheim am Glan, 1975
Linders, Tullia (red.), Opuscula Atheniensia: annual of the Swedish Institute at Athens. 18, [Tullia Linders 1.7.1990], Svenska institutet i Athen, Stockholm, 1990

References

1925 births
2008 deaths
Swedish archaeologists
Academic staff of Uppsala University
Swedish women archaeologists
20th-century archaeologists